Balasundra Vajravelu (died 28 June 2007) was an Indian association football player who played in the 1948 Olympics.

References

External links
 

Year of birth missing
2007 deaths
Indian footballers
Footballers from Bangalore
India international footballers
Olympic footballers of India
Footballers at the 1948 Summer Olympics
Place of birth missing
Association football midfielders